The Velabrum is the low valley in the city of Rome that connects the Forum with the Forum Boarium, and the Capitoline Hill with the western slope of the Palatine Hill. The name Velabrum may translate to "place of mud." It was believed that before the construction of the Cloaca Maxima, which probably follows the course of an ancient stream, the area was a swamp, though this claim has been disproven by core samples taken from Velabrum in 1994.  Ancient authorities state that in this marshy area the roots of a fig tree (Ficus Ruminalis) caught and stopped the basket carrying Romulus and Remus as it floated along on the Tiber current. The place therefore has a high symbolic significance. It was also used as a marketplace and a center of commerce.  
Even after the Cloaca was built, the area was still prone to flooding from the Tiber, until the ground level was raised after the Neronian fire.  

It is the site of the Arch of Janus, the Arcus Argentariorum and the church San Giorgio al Velabro.

References

Topography of the ancient city of Rome